Shigeru Uchida ( Uchida Shigeru; 15 March 1939 – 21 December 2022) was a Japanese politician. A member of the Liberal Democratic Party, he served as chairman of the Tokyo Metropolitan Assembly from 2003 to 2005.

Uchida died in Tokyo on 21 December 2022, at the age of 83.

References

1939 births
2022 deaths
21st-century Japanese politicians
Members of the Tokyo Metropolitan Assembly
Liberal Democratic Party (Japan) politicians
People from Chiyoda, Tokyo